The Convent of Santo Domingo is a convent (or monastery) of the Dominican Order in the city of Cusco, Peru. Spanish colonists built it on top of Coricancha, the most important Inca temple of the capital of the people's empire.

History
Juan Pizarro, brother of Francisco, gave the congregation this land containing the Inca temple. He had received the land in the distribution of lots that took place in October 1534. The congregation was founded that same year, and it was the first Dominican convent in what became Peru. Construction of the first convent building was completed in 1610.

The first prior of the Convent of Santo Domingo was Friar Juan de Olías. He occupied it with a group of Dominican missionaries from Mexico. The convent completely collapsed during the severe damage of the May 12, 1650 Cusco earthquake.

In 1680 construction of the current convent began, financially supported by patrons Diego López de Zúñiga and Antonio de Allende. The architects were Martín Gonzales de los Lagos, Sebastián Martínez and Pedro de Mesa. Part of the choir was built by Francisco Domínguez de Arellano. The convent (or monastery) was completed by addition of the Baroque bell tower in the early 18th century.

The earthquake of 1950 severely affected the bell tower and the apse chapel. These were quickly restored.

Description
Spaniards ordered the Coricancha temple to be torn apart for materials to construct the convent. It was built on top of the remains of that Inca temple. The church of three naves has a dome, stalls for the choir carved in cedar, and walls adorned with Sevillian azulejos, a kind of ceramic tilework.

Museum
Today a museum is operated inside the convent; it is divided into four areas:
The Coricancha.
Cusco School collection: the art gallery of viceregal art, shows, in two rooms, paintings and religious sculptures of the 16th, 17th and 18th centuries.
Contemporary art collection: modern works of art acquired by the museum.
"Colección Ganadores de Concursos del Convento": modern works of art that have obtained the major recognition in the “Predicarte” and “Concurso Navideño de Arte” contests organized by the Convent of Santo Domingo - Qorikancha to promote art in the city.

Gallery

See also
Coricancha
List of buildings and structures in Cusco
Andean Baroque

References

External links
The Convent of Santo Domingo website
Museum of the Convent of Santo Domingo - Qorikancha website

Roman Catholic churches in Cusco
1534 establishments in the Viceroyalty of Peru
18th-century Roman Catholic church buildings in Peru
Baroque architecture in Peru
Conversion of non-Christian religious buildings and structures into churches
Dominican convents
Museums in Cusco
Cultural heritage of Peru